Luke McCowan (born 9 December 1997) is a Scottish professional footballer who currently plays for Scottish Championship club Dundee.

Early life
McCowan was born in Greenock, Scotland and attended Notre Dame High School.

Career

Youth career
In 2015, McCowan won the West of Scotland Title with East End United F.C. While at the Ayr United's youth teams, he had a busy day as he had to be up at 5am to work as a lifeguard at Waterfront Leisure Complex before attending gym sessions in the afternoon, then driving for over an hour to train with Ayr.

Ayr United
On 1 July 2017, McCowan signed his first professional contract for Ayr United lasting one year. In his first season, he made five appearances, scoring one goal in all competitions, with one appearance coming in the League. On 6 June 2019, it was announced that McCowan had been given a two-year contract after getting rave reviews from the game against Partick Thistle in late April.

Dundee 
On 1 June 2021, McCowan signed a two-year deal with Scottish Premiership side Dundee. He made his debut for the club in the Scottish League Cup against Brora Rangers. McCowan would get his first competitive goal for the Dee the following week against Montrose. He would later score his first Premiership goal which clinched a win over Aberdeen.

In December 2022, McCowan would score a brace away against his former club Ayr United to help Dundee win and put them top of the Scottish Championship for Christmas.

Style of play
McCowan is left footed.

Career statistics

References

External links

1997 births
Living people
Footballers from Greenock
Scottish footballers
Ayr United F.C. players
Scottish Professional Football League players
Association football midfielders
Dundee F.C. players